South Africans in the United Kingdom include citizens and residents of the United Kingdom with origins in South Africa.

Demographics
The 2001 UK census recorded 140,201 South African-born people living in the UK. According to the 2011 UK census, 186,355 South African-born people were resident in England, 4,668 in Wales, 10,607 in Scotland and 1,847 in Northern Ireland. The Office for National Statistics (ONS) estimates that, 267,000 UK residents had been born in South Africa.

Unlike the country of South Africa itself, the majority of the South African diaspora living in the United Kingdom are White South Africans. 84% of South African-born residents of England and Wales at the time of the 2011 UK Census identified as White, with 44% identifying as White British. 6% identified as Black, 5% as Asian and 4% as mixed ethnicity.

Many are concentrated in  London, the anecdotal evidence being that many are business and financial people working in the City of London. University towns such as: Oxford also show significant clusters of South African-born students. Many young people with British family ties have come over the years to work in the UK, including in the public services.

Notable South Africans in the United Kingdom 

This list includes those who were born in South Africa and those who were born in another country but primarily raised in South Africa.

South African born British people have contributed heavily in sports, especially in Commonwealth sports such as Cricket and Rugby. 17 South African born players have played for the England national cricket team and over a dozen have played for both the England and Scotland national Rugby Union teams collectively.

British people of South African ancestry

References

African diaspora in the United Kingdom
+
Immigration to the United Kingdom by country of origin